Killjoy is an American fantasy comedy horror slasher film series which focuses on the titular Killjoy, a demonic clown who is summoned to assist revenge plots in all five films, only to prove too overwhelming for each character who calls him.

Films

Produced by Full Moon Features, the series was established in 2000 with the eponymous first installment, starring Ángel Vargas. A sequel, Killjoy 2: Deliverance from Evil, followed in 2002, which saw Trent Haaga replace Vargas for the role of Killjoy due to Vargas being busy with other projects. In spite of the negative reception of both films, Full Moon filmed a third installment while shooting Puppet Master: Axis of Evil in China, and in 2010 Killjoy 3 was released. Haaga reprised his role for Killjoy 3, eight years after the release of the previous film.

The original film was essentially an effort in the blaxploitation genre, and this was carried over to a lesser extent in Deliverance from Evil. Both of these films consisted of a largely African American cast; however, this element was greatly diminished for Killjoy 3, which was presented as something of a teen-slasher film. The titular character, as a clown, makes a number of crude jokes throughout the first two installments, but Killjoy 3 appears to be a genuine effort in black comedy. The third installment was also a first in establishing that Killjoy can be summoned through a blood pact; two different spoken rituals are used in the earlier films. The first film had a significantly more generous budget than its sequel, at a projected $150,000, dwarfing the $30,000 budget of Deliverance from Evil.

Full Moon Features launched a Kickstarter in early August 2014 to help raise funds for their upcoming movie named Killjoy's Psycho Circus. The company announced that the Kickstarter would raise $60,000 dollars while the company itself would add another $100,000 to make sure the series was produced. Full Moon set a one-month limit to raise their funds. The Kickstarter ended on September 3, 2014 and was unsuccessful. Charles Band has been quoted as saying that this is the company's way of experimenting and bringing their brand into the modern way of filmmaking. The film eventually premiered on October 30, 2016, on the El Rey Network.

Characters

Reception
Jimmy Totheo of JoBlo expressed that the series is "cheesy b-movie goodness".

References

External links

 
 
 
 
 

 
Full Moon Features films
Horror film series
Horror films about clowns
American monster movies